Miguel Krassnoff Martchenko (born Mikhail Semyonovich Krasnov, ; born 15 February 1946) is a Chilean military official involved in the 1973 Chilean coup d'état against president Salvador Allende. He held several high-ranking positions in the Pinochet regime, including in the Chilean intelligence agency, DINA. As such, he was responsible for the interrogation, torture, and disappearance of political prisoners at the detention center, Villa Grimaldi. After Pinochet's demise, Krassnoff was convicted by Chilean courts of crimes against humanity.

Biography

Early life 

His father, Semyon Krasnov, was a Russian White Army soldier who, after the Empire's defeat in the Russian Civil War, fled to Nazi Germany. After the defeat of Germany in World War II, he was extradited back to Russia (now the Soviet Union) and sentenced to death via hanging, along with his father, Pyotr Krasnov. As a result of this, young Miguel and his mother, Dina Marchenko, fled to Chile.

Semyon's father and Miguel's grandfather, Pyotr Krasnov, was a Don Cossack historian and Lieutenant General who became one of the leaders of the counter-revolutionary White movement and later a Nazi collaborator who mobilized Cossack forces to fight against the Soviet Union during World War II. 

He grew up speaking Russian at home and learned about the experiences of his ancestors. He believed that it was his fate to fight against communism but denies that he ever acted in the name of family revenge.

Career
Krassnoff was schooled at the School of the Americas, then located in Panama, before he returned to Chile. Upon returning to Chile, he served as Professor of Ethics at the Chilean Military Academy. On 11 September 1973, still serving his professorship, Krassnoff participated in the assault on the house of Chile's socialist president, Salvador Allende, which culminated in the 1973 Chilean coup d'état.

After the coup, he was appointed to the Chilean secret police (DINA), under Manuel Contreras. Krassnoff became director of the agency's two Halcón (Falcon) units, which were part of the Caupolicán Group. In turn, the group reported to the Brigada de Inteligencia Metropolitana (BIM). The BIM was ultimately responsible for suppressing political opposition in the Santiago region and the operation of detention camps in the region, including the Villa Grimaldi. The fate of the prisoners was decided by the group commanders and then relayed to the DINA headquarters via the BIM.

In 1979, after the dissolution of DINA, Krassnoff was assigned to Defence Intelligence. He later regretted that he was barred from becoming military attaché to the Soviet Union or securing a promotion to the rank of general because of his previous involvement in DINA.

Crimes against humanity and conviction
Krasnoff was one of the army officers involved in planning and administering Villa Grimaldi, the detention camp implicated in the torture of Chilean citizens under the Pinochet regime. He is referenced several times in the testimonies of Luz Arce, a prisoner and torture victim at Villa Grimaldi and later a collaborator with the regime.  In 2006, Krassnoff was sentenced to 144 years imprisonment for over 20 counts of crimes against humanity. In 2016, he was also sentenced to 10 years of imprisonment for the 1974 abduction of José Ramírez Rosales.

References

Bibliography
 Lazzara, M. J. (2011). Shame and Reconciliation. In Luz Arce and Pinochet's Chile. Palgrave Macmillan US.
 Wyndham, M., & Read, P. (2014). The disappearing museum. Rethinking History, 18(2), 165–180.

1946 births
Chilean Army officers
Chilean people convicted of crimes against humanity
Living people
People from Tyrol (state)
People of the Dirección de Inteligencia Nacional
Chilean people of Russian descent
Prisoners and detainees of Chile
Chilean people of Ukrainian descent
Naturalized citizens of Chile
Chilean anti-communists